The Helen Miller Gould was a short-lived mackerel fishing schooner. As the first large schooner fitted with an auxiliary engine, she was representative of the shift from sail to engine power.

Early years
She was designed by Captain G. Melvin McClain of Rockport, Massachusetts, who also designed the Effie M. Morrissey.  She was built by John Bishop, during the winter of 1899-1900 at the Vincent Cove yard in Gloucester, Massachusetts. She was launched on March 29, 1900, before a crowd of more than 3,000 people.  Captain Jacobs (King of the Mackerel Killers) was on board during the launch, along with Captain G. Melvin McClain, a few other captains, and Captain Jacobs' daughter who broke the wine bottle to christen the ship.

Later in 1900, the owners installed a 35 horse power Globe engine to supplement the sails. Subsequently they installed a larger, 150 horse power engine, which increased her speed to 8 knots. With the larger engine she began her true mackerel fishing career, with Jacobs as captain.

Brief fishing career
The Helen Miller Gould survived only a year after her launch, but in that year, set and broke mackerel fishing records. The 150 horse power engine showed Captain Jacobs that auxiliary power enabled faster trips, which led to bigger profits.

The month after launch, and two weeks after heading to sea on April 12, 1900, she arrived in New York with over 200 barrels of fresh mackerel, which sold for nine or ten cents a pound.

The success continued. On September 3, she returned to Gloucester, Massachusetts with 720 barrels of mackerel, which broke all records. In that year she stocked $40,660, at a share of $863.

Sudden end 
On October 25, 1901—seventeen months after her launch—she caught fire at North Sydney, Nova Scotia from a leak in the gasoline apparatus and burned to the waterline. The threat of an explosion prevented the kind of fire-fighting efforts that might have saved her. The crew escaped with their lives, but lost all their personal belongings.

References

External links 
 Limited View of "Caught in Irons: North Atlantic Fishermen in the Last Days of Sail" (Thanks to Google Books) 
 Article from the day after the Gould had caught fire (Thanks to The NY Times Archive)

Schooners of the United States
Shipwrecks of the Nova Scotia coast
Ships built in Gloucester, Massachusetts
1900 ships
Fishing ships of the United States
Ship fires